Calyptogena magnifica is a species of giant white clam found clustered around hydrothermal vents at abyssal depths in the Pacific Ocean.

Description
The systematics of the family Vesicomyidae is unclear because of the small number of specimens collected, the variability between specimens of the same species and their wide dispersal in isolated, deep water locations. The morphology of Calyptogena magnifica resembles another member of the genus, Calyptogena elongata, the type locality of which is several hundred miles further north. C elongata is only known from three small specimens and the size of mature individuals is unknown.

The two valves of Calyptogena magnifica are oval or slightly kidney-shaped and about two times as long as they are high. The umbones are towards the anterior end of the valve and the growth rings are most noticeable near the margins. The shell material is thick and the exterior is white and usually chalky in appearance. The periostracum is yellowish brown, wrinkled and loose. The ligament is external and there are several U-shaped cardinal hinge teeth on each valve. The mantle is an iridescent purplish pink and there is a large pink protrusible foot divided into two portions. The two separate siphons are short and do not extend beyond the edge of the valves. The pallial sinus is small. The gills are large and thick and the visceral mass is red due to the haemoglobin in the blood.

Distribution
Calyptogena magnifica was first described by Kenneth Boss and Ruth Turner of Harvard's Museum of Comparative Zoology, in 1980, following its discovery during research dives by the submersible vehicle DSV Alvin to the floor of the Pacific Ocean in 1977 and 1979. Further deep water exploration shows that it is present at other thermal vents on the East Pacific Rise between 21°N and 22°S as well as in the Galapagos Rift. In some locations it is plentiful while in other, apparently suitable habitats, it is not present at all.

Biology
Calyptogena magnifica is assumed to burrow and it is thought the divided foot may be specially adapted for insertion into cracks in hard substrates or among mussels (Bathymodiolus thermophilus). The animal can move around on the sea floor with its muscular foot and usually takes up a vertical position rather than lying flat.

Calyptogena magnifica is specially adapted to life round hydrothermal vents by the chemosymbiotic bacteria it harbours in its gills which oxidize hydrogen sulfide seeping from the vents. The clam absorbs nutrients produced by these bacteria rather than photosynthetically derived products and no longer has guts.

Little is known of the reproduction and life cycle of Calyptogena magnifica but examination of specimens brought up from the deep showed numerous large oocytes with yolks in various stages of development among the visceral mass. Researchers thought this might mean that the clam had poor dispersal abilities but a study using rDNA analysis showed that larvae did in fact disperse to other vents throughout its range. Hydrothermal vents emit hot, sulfur-rich water for several years and then cease to flow. This results in the death of the community surrounding them, and for the continuing existence of their species, there is a need for the larvae of these animals to have dispersed to other existing vents and for them to exploit new vents when they open up.

Ecology
Calyptogena magnifica was found near thermal vents in the deep sea floor where it was part of a rich benthic community. There were considerable numbers of empty shells and a few live individuals in the small area studied. The clams were lodged in crevices among a large number of mussels and some large galatheid crabs were observed walking over the bed of bivalves. Shrimps and octopuses were also observed in the vicinity.

References

Vesicomyidae
Animals living on hydrothermal vents
Molluscs described in 1980
Chemosynthetic symbiosis